Chullpa (Aymara for an ancient funerary building (chullpa)) is a  mountain in the Andes of Bolivia east of Poopó Lake. It is located in the Oruro Department, Sebastián Pagador Province, which is identical to the Santiago de Huari Municipality. Chullpa lies north-west of the mountain Chullpani and south-east of the mountains Wari Pukyu (Huari Pukio, Huari Pujyo), and Chullpa Qullu (Chullpa Kkollu). It is situated near the Parya River.

References 

Mountains of Oruro Department